The +2s is a Brazilian band from Rio de Janeiro that composes samba but, at the same time, incorporates the sounds of funk and psychedelia into their music. The music group consists of Moreno Veloso, Domenico Lancelotti, and Alexandre Kassin (who also recorded the music to the anime Michiko to Hatchin). Each of them released a single album under their name with the suffix “+2” meaning “and two others”.

+2 is signed to the record label Luaka Bop. This world music label has released three +2 albums: Music Typewriter, Sincerely Hot, and Futurismo.

Discography
 Moreno+2: Máquina de Escrever Música (2000, ROCKiT!)
 released by Luaka Bop first as Moreno Veloso+2: Music Typewriter (2001) and later as Moreno+2: Music Typewriter (2005)
 Domenico+2: Sincerely Hot (2003, Luaka Bop)
 Kassin+2: Futurismo (2007, Luaka Bop)

References

Brazilian musical groups
Luaka Bop artists